Janet Marion Davies (born 29 May 1939 in Cardiff) is a Plaid Cymru Welsh politician. She was the National Assembly for Wales Member for South Wales West from 1999 to 2007, retiring at the 2007 election.

Background
Davies was educated at Howell's School Llandaff, Cardiff and Trinity College, Carmarthen (BA Hons), the University of Wales and the Open University (BA Hons). Davies was a Nurse and Midwife in the 1960s.

Political career
Davies is a former Member of Taff Ely Borough Council (1983–96), Leader of Council 1991–96, and Mayor from 1995 to 1996. She contested the Pontypridd constituency for Plaid Cymru in the 1983 General Election, finishing fourth of five candidates with 4.7% of the vote.

She then stood in the 1985 Brecon and Radnor by-election, finishing fourth out of seven with 1.1% of the vote., and in Merthyr Tydfil and Rhymney in the 1987 General Election, finishing last with 4.7% of the vote. She has served as Director of elections and a member of the Plaid Cymru National Executive. She was Chief Whip for the Plaid Group in the National Assembly.

In the Second Assembly (2003–07) she was a member of the following committees: Audit Committee (Chair); Scrutiny of the First Minister Committee; Public Audit Act Commencement Order Committee 2005; Public Audit (Wales) Bill Committee 2003; and the Public Audit (Wales) Bill Committee 2004.

References

External links
Plaid Cymru - the Party of Wales Website
 Profile on BBC Website September 1999

Offices held

1938 births
Living people
Politicians from Cardiff
Wales AMs 1999–2003
Wales AMs 2003–2007
Alumni of the Open University
Plaid Cymru members of the Senedd
People educated at Howell's School Llandaff
Plaid Cymru parliamentary candidates